Esmond can refer to:

People
 Annie Esmond (1873–1945), British film actress
Burton D. Esmond (1870–1944), American lawyer, politician
 Carl Esmond (1902–2004), Austrian actor
 Henry V. Esmond (1869–1922), English actor, playwright
 James Esmond (1822–1890), Irish-Australian gold prospector
 Jill Esmond (1908–1990), English actress
 Jimmy Esmond (1889–1948), American professional baseball player

Literary characters
 The History of Henry Esmond, 1852 novel by William Makepeace Thackeray

Places
 Esmond, Illinois
 Esmond, North Dakota
 Esmond, Rhode Island
 Esmond, South Dakota
 Esmond, Victoria, Australia